Añorada Airport  was a rural airstrip  north of Frutillar, a town in the Los Lagos Region of Chile.

Google Earth Historical Imagery (4/6/2010) and subsequent show a former  grass strip now with an agricultural processing facility and a stock pond built on it.

See also

Transport in Chile
List of airports in Chile

References

External links
OpenStreetMap - Añorada Airport

Defunct airports
Airports in Los Lagos Region